Arthur Lane may refer to:

 Arthur Bliss Lane (1894–1956), United States Ambassador to Poland, 1944–1947
 Arthur Lane (actor) (1910–1987), British actor
 Arthur Stephen Lane (1910–1997), United States federal judge